San Teodoro (Sicilian: U Casali) is a comune (municipality) in the Province of Messina in the Italian region Sicily, located about  east of Palermo and about  southwest of Messina.

San Teodoro borders the following municipalities: Cesarò, Troina.

References

Cities and towns in Sicily